Nelson Ricardo Álamo Flores (born December 10, 1970) better known as Ricardo Álamo is a Venezuelan actor, television director, television producer, model and taxi driver.

Personal life 
He married Marjorie de Sousa in May 2004. The couple divorced in 2006.

Filmography

Films

Television

As producer  and director

References

External links

RCTV Biography

1970 births
Living people
RCTV personalities
Venezuelan male film actors
Venezuelan male telenovela actors
Male actors from Caracas